Trailokyanath Chakraborty (2 August 1889 – 9 August 1970) was an Indian independence activist and politician. He led and worked with other renowned freedom fighters and led to freedom of India. He lived for 80 years, out of which he spent 30 years in jail. Some of his years in jail was after Indian independence in Bangladesh, which was under Pakistan control, after partition of India into India and Pakistan.  He was born in 1889 at Kapasiatia  district Mymensingh in present-day Bangladesh. He joined in freedom struggle as a boy of 7 years old while  in school in 1906 and became a leader of the Dhaka Anushilan Samiti. He was first arrested for his revolutionary activities in 1908, as a result of that he could not finish his education. However, he could speak 3-4 of Indian languages apart from English. Many of these languages he learnt in jail from his jail mates. He was one of the chief accused in the Barisal Conspiracy Case of 1913, and was sentenced by the British and transported to the Andamans as a result. After independence in 1947, he became a politician and parliamentary member. He died in 1970 in Delhi, India. In spite of being freedom fighter and spending much of his life in hiding, he had strong influence in family of his brothers, education of grand kids, their marriage decisions. He inspired many girl grandchildren to get higher degrees in education. He never married.

Early life
Chakravarty joined the revolutionary organization Anushilan Samiti in 1906 while in school. He was arrested for revolutionary activity in 1908, and consequently could not complete his schooling. In 1912, he was arrested for a murder but later released due to lack of evidence. He was arrested again, in Calcutta in 1914, due to his underground revolutionary activities carried out in Rajshahi, Comilla and Malda and was sent to Andaman for the Barisal Conspiracy Case.

Role in freedom struggle

Trailokyanath came back to Calcutta on the expiry of his sentence. There he took the charge of the National School. He was arrested once more in 1927 and was sent to a prison at Mandalaya in Burma. He was released in 1928 when he joined the Hindustan Republican Army. He participated in the Lahore Congress in 1929. He was in jail again from 1930 to 1938. After his release, Trailokyanath joined the Ramgarh Congress. He made a futile attempt to stir rebellion in the British Indian army during the Second World War. He participated in the quit India movement and was imprisoned in 1942. However, he was released from jail in 1946. He now devoted himself to organisational activities in Noakhali.

After independence
After the partition of India in 1947, Chakravarty joined politics in East Pakistan. He founded the Pakistan Socialist Party. He was elected member of the Provincial Assembly in 1954 as a nominee of the United Front. After promulgation of martial law in the country in 1958, an embargo was imposed on his political and social activities. He passed the final years of his life in self-exile at his village home. He wrote two memoirs on contemporary politics entitled Jele Trish Bachhar, Pak-Bharater Swadhinata Sangram. His other contribution is Geetai Swaraj.

Death 
Chakravarty had been suffering from a dilated heart and traveled to Calcutta for treatment in 1970. From there, he was carried to Delhi and was accorded a national reception. He died at 3:30 a.m. (IST) on 9 August that year at the residence of his former associate Surendra Mohan Ghose. His remains were cremated the following day in Calcutta at the Keoratola crematorium. The last rites were performed by his nephew.

A two-minute silence was observed in Lok Sabha, the lower House of the Indian Parliament, following Chakravarty's death as a mark of respect. India's Prime Minister Indira Gandhi remarked: "His daring and courage inspired young men of older generation. Long years of suffering didn't weaken his belief in democracy or his complete commitment to socialism and secularism."

References

External links
 

Revolutionary movement for Indian independence
Indian revolutionaries
20th-century Bengalis
Bangladeshi Hindus
1889 births
1970 deaths
People from Mymensingh District